Mount Macolod (other spelling: Maculot) is a dormant stratovolcano located in the municipality of Cuenca, Batangas in the Philippines. Popular with mountain climbers and campers, it is the main tourist attraction of Cuenca. 

The mountain is sacred to both Christians and Anitists. Every year on Holy Week, thousands of pilgrims from nearby towns and provinces climb the mountain as a form of penance.

Geography 

Geological history
Based on studies on Taal, it is believed that an ancient Taal Cone was formed by buildup of large volume dacitic pyroclastic materials more than 140,000 years ago. Several major catastrophic eruptions probably between 27,000 and 5,000 years ago destroyed this greater Taal Cone and ultimately formed the  depression now known as Taal Caldera. This depression was filled by water, thus forming a lake. The younger Volcano Island was formed by numerous explosive hydrovolcanic eruptions in the middle of the lake after the collapse.

The slopes of the previous volcano now formed ridges surrounding the lake. Mount Macolod is not only a volcanic cone on the south side but also the highest caldera rim of the former Taal Cone. Tagaytay Ridge, to the north, is the northern rim of the caldera with Mount Sungay its highest elevation.

Gallery

See also
 List of mountains in the Philippines

References

External links
Hiking Mount Macolod on YouTube

Mountains of the Philippines
Landforms of Batangas
Tourist attractions in Batangas
Stratovolcanoes of the Philippines